St Dominic's Grammar School for Girls (Irish: Scoil Ghramadaí Naomh Doiminic do Chailíní), formerly St Dominic's High School, is a Catholic grammar school for girls aged 11–18 (Years 8–14), in Belfast, Northern Ireland.

History
St. Dominic's was founded by the Dominican Order in 1870 at the invitation of the Most Reverend Dr. Dorrian, Bishop of Down and Connor on the Falls Road in Belfast. It was originally named St. Mary's Dominican Convent. When it opened on April 25, 1870, there were four pupils enrolled. The Boarding School opened on April 29 with one pupil and the Study Hall Block was built in 1897. The school has grown significantly over the years with the addition of the St. Margaret's Wing in 1950's, St. Thomas's Building in 1960s and the erection of St. Ita's and St.Raymond's in the 1970s.

Academics
St. Dominic's has topped the A-Level league table of schools in Northern Ireland with over 95% of entrants receiving 3 or more A-levels at Grades A* to C. In 2019, the school was placed 2nd out of 159 secondary schools in Northern Ireland in its A-Level performance with 94.5% entrants in the 2017–18 academic year receiving this level.  In 2021, 98.5 per cent of pupils achieved grades A* to C in three subjects at A Level. Of these A-level students, 69 per cent of grades achieved were A* or A and 92 per cent were A* to B.

In the 2018 Belfast Telegraph GCSE League Table, it was ranked joint ninth in Northern Ireland for its GCSE performance with 99.3% of its entrants to the exam in 2016–17 receiving five or more GCSEs at grades A* to C, including the core subjects English and Maths. In the 2019 League Table it was ranked joint sixth with 99.4% of its GCSE exam entrants receiving five or more A* to C grades.

The school is a specialist school for humanities.

Since 2022, St. Dominic's has collaborated with Friends' School, Lisburn in the development of a Shared Education Signature Project. The primary focus of the project has been creating a ‘Shared History’ based around the events of 1916. History Departments in both schools felt that a more ‘joined-up’ approach to the teaching of the Battle of the Somme and the Easter Rising was necessary.

Sports and Extra-curricular activities
Students can participate in a wide range of sporting activities including athletics, netball, basketball, gaelic football, camogie, fitness training, rugby, soccer, swimming, volleyball, trampolining, water polo and dance.

There is an increasing variety of extra-curricular activities and clubs in which the students are encouraged to participate.  These include: African drumming, book club, cookery club, Cumann Gaelach, dance club, Spanish club, Habitat for Humanity, Homework club, Maths club, Mock Bar Trial, needlework club, poetry reading, science club, technology club, art club, choir, creative writing club, cumann ceoil, French club, Geo club, history club, library club, music, orchestra, public speaking, and young enterprise.

Awards
In 2018, it was awarded The Times Northern Ireland Secondary School of the Year.

Alumni

See also
 Dominicans in Ireland
 List of secondary schools in Belfast
 List of grammar schools in Northern Ireland

External links
 St. Dominic's High School website
 St. Dominic's Past Pupils' Union

References

Educational institutions established in 1870
Grammar schools in Belfast
Dominican schools in the United Kingdom
Catholic secondary schools in Northern Ireland
Girls' schools in Northern Ireland
1870 establishments in Ireland

Specialist colleges in Northern Ireland